Farahabad Complex is a collection of monuments that relate to the remains of Farahabad Old Town.It was built during the reign of Abbas the Great.

Residual Buildings 
Many of the city's monuments have been destroyed throughout history by invasion. Farahabad Mosque, school, part of Shah Abbasi bridge, wall belonging to a palace and baths َAnd Jahan Nama Palace of the Safavid dynasty era.

Gallery

Sources 

National works of Iran
Buildings and structures in Mazandaran Province
Tourist attractions in Mazandaran Province
Tourist attractions in Sari